Amnon Carmeli (born 22 August 1929, died 4 December 1993) was a former Israeli footballer who played for Maccabi Petah Tikva, scoring the club's winning goal in the 1952 State Cup final. Carmeli also played one match for the Israel national football team, against Yugoslavia national football team, in 1954.

After retirement, in 1960, Carmeli stayed close to Maccabi Petah Tikva, becoming a board member in 1969. Carmeli also served as the club's chairmen.

Honours
Israel State Cup (1):
1951–52

References

1929 births
1993 deaths
20th-century Israeli Jews
Israeli footballers
Israel international footballers
Maccabi Petah Tikva F.C. players
Liga Leumit players
Footballers from Petah Tikva
Association football forwards